José "Count" Leblanc Vargas (1894 – February 6, 1922)  was a Negro leagues pitcher for several years before the founding of the first Negro National League, and in its first two seasons. He died in Cuba after being struck in the head with a bat by Antonio Susini during an extended argument between both teams and the umpires over a close play at home in a local championship series.

References

External links
 and Baseball-Reference Black Baseball stats and Seamheads

Cuban Stars (West) players
Philadelphia Giants players
1922 deaths
1894 births
Cuban expatriate baseball players in the United States
People murdered in Cuba